Vagif (or Vaqif in the Azerbaijani transcription) is a common given name in Azerbaijan.  Of Persian origin, it means "clever" or "watchful". 

Notable Vagifs include:
Molla Panah Vagif (1717-1797), poet and statesman, founder of the "realist" school in Azerbaijani poetry
Vagif Mustafazadeh (1940-1979), iconic jazz pianist, creator of fusion style with Azerbaijani mugham
Vagif Bayatly Oner (b. 1948), poet and translator 
Vagif Javadov (b. 1989), Azerbaijani footballer
Vagif Jafarov (1949–1991), Azerbaijani politician